"Rollercoaster" is a song by Swedish group Dolly Style. The song was released in Sweden as a digital download on 28 February 2016, and was written by Thomas G:son, Peter Boström, and Alexandra Salomonsson. It is currently taking part in Melodifestivalen 2016, and qualified to the Second Chance round (andra chansen) from the fourth semi-final. In andra chansen, it was eliminated.

Track listing

Chart performance

Weekly charts
{| class="wikitable sortable plainrowheaders"
|-
! scope="col"| Chart (2016)
! scope="col"| Peakposition
|-
rollercoaster(sing back version)

Release history

References

2015 songs
2016 singles
Capitol Records singles
Melodifestivalen songs of 2016
Dolly Style songs
Songs written by Thomas G:son
Songs written by Peter Boström
English-language Swedish songs